Lee Ji-sol (born 9 July 1999) is a South Korean footballer currently playing as a defender for Jeju United FC.

Career statistics

Club

Honours

International

South Korea U20
FIFA U-20 World Cup runner-up: 2019

References

1999 births
Living people
South Korean footballers
Association football defenders
K League 2 players
Daejeon Hana Citizen FC players
South Korea under-20 international footballers